Yantacaw Brook is a tributary of the Third River in Essex County, New Jersey, United States. The brook rises in Montclair and then continues into the Third River in Bloomfield, New Jersey and then into Belleville and Nutley, where it enters the Passaic River. Both Yantacaw Brook and the Third River were referred to by the Lenape people as Yantokah or Yantacaw.

Yanticaw Park
Yanticaw Park, through which the brook flows, is located in Nutley.

Yantacaw Brook Park

Yantacaw Brook Park  is a town operated park located in Montclair. It has a small pond fed by the stream.

See also
List of rivers of New Jersey

References

Rivers of Essex County, New Jersey
Tributaries of the Passaic River
Rivers of New Jersey